The second season of NCIS: Los Angeles an American police procedural drama television series originally aired on CBS from September 21, 2010, through May 17, 2011. The season was produced by Shane Brennan Productions and CBS Television Studios, with Shane Brennan as showrunner and executive producer. The season continues to follow the stories of the members of the Office of Special Projects, an undercover division of the Naval Criminal Investigative Service (NCIS).

The season features a major cast change: Eric Christian Olsen joins the cast, reprising his role as Marty Deeks from season one. Renée Felice Smith joins the team in episode 4 in a recurring capacity, and is promoted to a starring role in the eleventh episode. Peter Cambor is no longer a series regular, and is credited as a special guest star in the 4 episodes he appears.

Cast and characters

Main 
 Chris O'Donnell as G. Callen, NCIS Senior Special Agent (SSA) of the Office of Special Projects (O.S.P.) in Los Angeles
 Daniela Ruah as Kensi Blye, NCIS Junior field Agent
 Eric Christian Olsen as Marty Deeks, L.A.P.D. Detective And Liaison To NCIS
 Barrett Foa as Eric Beale, NCIS Technical Operator
 Renée Felice Smith as Nell Jones, NCIS Junior Field Agent and Intelligence Analyst
 Linda Hunt as Henrietta Lange, NCIS Supervisory Special Agent (SSA) and Operations Manager
 LL Cool J as Sam Hanna, NCIS Senior Agent, second in command

Recurring 
 Rocky Carroll as Leon Vance, NCIS Director stationed in Washington D.C.
 Kathleen Rose Perkins as Rose Schwartz, coroner in Los Angeles
 Ronald Auguste as Mohad "Moe" Dusa
 Vyto Ruginis as Arkady Kolcheck
 Claire Forlani as Lauren Hunter, NCIS Senior Special Agent and temporary Operations Manager
 Raymond J. Barry as Branston Cole
 Peter Cambor as Nate Getz, NCIS Special Agent

Guests 
 Alicia Coppola as Lisa Rand
 Marisol Nichols as Tracy Keller
 Erik Jensen as Landon Frisbee
 Craig Robert Young as Dracul Comescu

Episodes

Production

Development 
NCIS: Los Angeles was renewed for a second season on January 14, 2010.

Broadcast 
Season two of NCIS: Los Angeles premiered on September 21, 2010.

Reception 
NCIS: Los Angeles ranked #7 with a total of 16.54 million viewers for the 2010–11 U.S. network television season.

Ratings

Home video release

References 

General

External links 
 
 

2010 American television seasons
2011 American television seasons
02